Germano Caraffini (4 May 1936 – 6 October 2011) was an Italian wrestler. He competed in the men's freestyle middleweight at the 1960 Summer Olympics.

References

External links
 

1936 births
2011 deaths
Italian male sport wrestlers
Olympic wrestlers of Italy
Wrestlers at the 1960 Summer Olympics
Sportspeople from Genoa